Valerie Ann Brisco-Hooks (born July 6, 1960, in Greenwood, Mississippi) is an Olympian who won three gold medals as an Olympic track and field athlete at the 1984 Olympics at Los Angeles, California, making her the first Olympian to win gold medals in both the 200- and 400-meter races at a single Olympics.

Career
Valerie's outstanding high school performance led her to the collegiate level of track and field at California State University, Northridge. She continued to excel, winning the 200-meter title at the Association of Intercollegiate Athletics for Women (AIAW) Championships and earning a spot on the U.S. team for the 1979 Pan American Games, where she helped her 4 × 100-meter relay team win the gold medal.

Her 400 metres time of 48.83, set while winning the 1984 Olympics was at the time the Olympic record and still ranks her as the tenth fastest woman of all time.
She also won a gold medal for the 4 × 400 m. Brisco competed in the 1988 Olympic Games, which took place in Seoul, South Korea, running on the American 4x400 meter-relay team, which finished in second place (but below the older record, also), behind the Soviet team that broke the 4x400 meter-relay world record. 
To this date, the American time possesses the second-fastest 4x400 relay of all time, behind only the Soviet winner of that race.

Brisco-Hooks is currently coaching with the Bob Kersee group of athletes and at West Los Angeles College.

Achievements
3 x Olympic Games Gold medallist
1 x Olympic Games Silver medallist
1 x World Championships Bronze medallist
5 x Olympic Games finalist
1 x World Championships finalist
1 x Current NACAC Record holder - 4 × 400 m

Personal Bests
Event	Result	Wind	Venue	Date
50m individual	6.24		Rosemont (USA)	16.02.1986
100m	10.99	+1.3	Westwood (USA)	17.05.1986
200m	21.81	-0.1	Los Angeles (USA)	09.08.1984
200m indoor	22.83		New York (USA)	22.02.1985
300m	35.47		Seoul (KOR)	26.09.1988
400m	48.83		Los Angeles (USA)	06.08.1984
400m indoor	52.31		Fairfax (USA)	14.02.1988
4 × 400 m	3:15.51		Seoul (KOR)	01.10.1988

Television guest appearance
Brisco-Hooks guest-starred as herself in "Off to the Races," an episode from the second season of The Cosby Show. She ran against Cliff Huxtable (Bill Cosby) at the Penn Relays, filling in at the last minute for an injured member of a rival team during a relay race.e

Personal life

Valerie Brisco-Hooks, who won three gold medals at the 1984 Summer Olympics, gained over 40 pounds during her pregnancy and did not resume training until well after her child was born in 1982. 
Husband: Alvin Hooks (NFL football player, m. 1981), Son: Alvin Hooks, Jr. (b. 1982) & Valerie's nephew, Amar Brisco, was a football cornerback in the 1990s at NCAA UNLV.
Valerie Brisco-Hooks with her son Alvin Jr. at the 1984 Olympic trials.

The West Athens Elementary, Locke High School, California State University Northridge Alum was inducted in the United States Track and Field Hall of Fame in 1995. Valerie Brisco-Hooks Sports Foundation Inc is located at 1138 E 71st St Los Angeles, California 90001. She became an advocate for drug-free schools and actively sought out opportunities to interact with students in the classroom to convey her message. She made time in her training and competition schedule because she felt so passionately about making a difference.

It was not until meeting Jackie Joyner Kersee that she changed her work ethic 

As a young girl she moved with her family from the rural south to the urban Watts neighborhood in Los Angeles. She was inspired to run by her older brothers, Robert and Melvin Brisco. Robert and Melvin were finishing a hard workout at their high school track late one day, when the violence of the neighborhood struck and a stray bullet shot from a gun held by a ninth-grader killed Robert.

References

External links
SportingHeroes.net article on Valerie Brisco-Hooks
1984 Olympic Women's 200 meters
 1984 Olympic Women's 400 meters
Image of Valerie Brisco-Hooks showing her Olympic medals to students at West Athens Elementary school in Los Angeles, California, 1984. Los Angeles Times Photographic Archive (Collection 1429). UCLA Library Special Collections, Charles E. Young Research Library, University of California, Los Angeles.

1960 births
Living people
American female sprinters
People from Greenwood, Mississippi
Athletes (track and field) at the 1984 Summer Olympics
Athletes (track and field) at the 1988 Summer Olympics
Olympic gold medalists for the United States in track and field
Olympic silver medalists for the United States in track and field
American track and field coaches
World Athletics Championships medalists
Track and field athletes from California
Medalists at the 1988 Summer Olympics
Medalists at the 1984 Summer Olympics
Athletes (track and field) at the 1979 Pan American Games
Athletes (track and field) at the 1987 Pan American Games
Pan American Games gold medalists for the United States
Cal State Northridge Matadors women's track and field athletes
Pan American Games medalists in athletics (track and field)
World Athletics Championships athletes for the United States
Medalists at the 1987 Pan American Games
Olympic female sprinters